This page provides supplementary chemical data on bismuth(III) oxide.

Material Safety Data Sheet  
MSDS from Fischer Scientific

Structure and properties

Thermodynamic properties

Spectral data

References 

Chemical data pages
Chemical data pages cleanup